Geeta Citygirl (born October 6, 1971) is an actress, dancer, director, producer and the founder and artistic director of SALAAM, the first South Asian American theatre, arts and film company in the USA. Based in New York City, the theatre company was started in the year 2000. SALAAM Theatre and Geeta Citygirl received the SAMA Award for Excellence in Theater in June 2005.  She currently serves as the Artistic Director of SALAAM Theatre and is active on advisory boards as well as board member for several arts organizations. 

A graduate of the American Academy of Dramatic Arts and the City College of New York, her acting, directing and producing credits range from the stage to the screen. 

Her contributions to the arts community in general, and the South-Asian community specifically, have long been recognized. A widely sought-after professional cultural consultant for the South Asian diaspora as well as a Mindfulness and arts educator and activist. And a proud member of the LGBTQI+ community. 

She joined the likes of award-winning actor Richard Schiff and best-selling author Walter Mosley, when she was selected to be the chief guest speaker at the 20th Annual CCNY Honors Convocation. She served as an emcee at numerous Asian Heritage Festivals in NY and around the nation, including in Union Square at the largest Pan-Asian outdoor event on the East coast, which was attended by over ten thousand people. 

She hosts New York’s Annual Tagore Festival, and a popular series presented by SALAAM Theater. She’s been featured in magazines and news dailies, and was even named one of the ‘Top 100 New Yorkers of the Year’ in 2003, by the New York Resident. 

Her parents were both refugees of the 1947 Partition of India.  They fled to Delhi, and in the 1960’s, found their way to the city of NY.  They settled in New York.

Theater 
Acting credits span a glitteringly dissimilar array of thematic elements and inspired energies. In 2012, she was nominated for "Outstanding Featured Performance in a Play Female" by the San Diego Theatre Critics Circle for her performances in The Old Globe's production of Ayub Khan-Din's RAFTA, RAFTA. 

Graduate of the American Academy of Dramatic Arts and the City College of New York.

She was part of the cast of The Signature Theatre Company's world-premiere production of Charles Mee's Queens Boulevard (the musical) to rave reviews.  And has been seen on countless New York stages.  Other works include: Serendib at the Ensemble Studio Theater.  The Wound at LaMama. Democracy in Islam at Theater for the New City.

In 1999, Geeta Citygirl directed the American premiere of the controversial play, A Touch of Brightness by Partap Sharma at Harlem's Aaron Davis Hall.  She also directed Rabindranath Tagore's Karna and Kunti as well as Badal Sircar's And Indrajit.  A graduate of the American Academy of Dramatic Arts NY and the City College of New York (CCNY), she was born and raised in New York. NY Stage credits include La MaMa Experimental Theatre Club, Theater for the New City, and Ensemble Studio Theatre.

Name 
Her first name reflects her South Asian immigrants; Punjabi roots from Lahore - Geeta being a traditional name.  Geet being a book of songs.  And Citygirl reflecting her native New York birth.  She is the first-born American child of both sides of her biological parents' families.  Her professional name has been Geeta Citygirl since she was 18years old.

City Kindness Crew 
In 2020, at the beginning of the COVID19 shutdown in New York, she and her daughter started a group called the City Kindness Crew.  They offer mindfulness and Sanskrit chanting as an offering to help heal Mama Earth.  The daily practice began in March 2020 and was originally offered to everyone on planet earth, live and for free. Since then, they continue to share their mindfulness practices to the community but have limited their online presence.  The mission to educate, evolve and entertain as well as uplift and nurture the spirit of loving kindness is at the forefront of their activities.  As activists and proud members of the LGBTQi communities, they focus on embracing diversity with a focus on children and all living beings.

External links

Salaam Theatre

Living people
1971 births
Actresses from New York City
American stage actresses
American television actresses
21st-century American women